Events from the year 1929 in Mexico

Incumbents

Federal government
President: 
Emilio Portes Gil (starting December 1)
 Interior Secretary (SEGOB): 
 Secretary of Foreign Affairs (SRE): 
 Communications Secretary (SCT): 
 Education Secretary (SEP):

Supreme Court

 President of the Supreme Court:

Governors
 Aguascalientes: Manuel Carpio Velázquez (PNR)
 Campeche: Ramiro Bojórquez Castillo
 Chiapas: : Raymundo E. Enríquez (1928–1929), Ernesto Constantino Herrera (1929), Alvaro Cancino (1929)
 Chihuahua: 1928 - 1929: Marcelo Caraveo (1928-1929), Luis L. León (1929), Francisco R. Almada (1929), Luis L. León (1929), Francisco R. Almada (1929-1930)
 Coahuila: Manuel Pérez Treviño (1925-1929), :es:Nazario S. Ortiz Garza (PNR, 1929–1933)
 Colima: Laureano Cervantes
 Durango:  
 Guanajuato: Agustín Arroyo 
 Guerrero: Adrián Castrejón (PNR)
 Hidalgo: Matías Rodríguez (1925–1929), Bartolomé Vargas Lugo (1929–1933)
 Jalisco: Margarito Ramírez (1927–1929), José María Cuellar (1929–1930) 
 State of Mexico: Carlos Riva Palacio, (1925–1929), Filiberto Gómez (PNR, 1929–1933)
 Michoacán: : Lázaro Cárdenas (1928–1929), Dámaso Cárdenas del Río (1929–1930)
 Morelos: Ambrosio Puente (interim)
 Nayarit: José de la Peña Ledón
 Nuevo León: Plutarco Elías Calles (son) (PNR, 1929), National Revolutionary Party, PNR, Generoso Chapa Garza, (PNR 1929), Aarón Sáenz, (PNR, 1929–1931)
 Oaxaca: Francisco López Cortés
 Puebla: Donato Bravo Izquierdo (1927-1929), Leónides Andrew Almazán (PNR, 1929-1932)
 Querétaro: Abraham Araujo (1927-1929), Ángel Vázquez Mellado (1929), Ramón Anaya (1929-1931)
 San Luis Potosí: Saturnino Cedillo
 Sinaloa: Macario Gaxiola (PNR)
 Sonora: Fausto Topete (1927–1929), Francisco S. Elías (PNR, 1929–1931)
 Tabasco: vacant
 Tamaulipas: Juan Rincón (1928–1929), Baudelio Villanueva (PNR), Francisco Castellanos (PNR, 1929–1933)
 Tlaxcala: 
 Veracruz: Adalberto Tejeda Olivares (Second Term)
 Yucatán: Álvaro Torre Díaz
 Zacatecas: Leobardo C. Ruiz

Events
 March 3 –  Escobar Rebellion: A revolt by Generals José Gonzalo Escobar and Jesús María Aguirre, challenging the power of Plutarco Elías Calles, ends in failure. 
 November 17 – General election: Pascual Ortiz Rubio of the National Revolutionary Party is elected the new President. It is now widely thought that the election was rigged.

Ongoing
Mexican Repatriation (1929-1936)

Births
 January 4 – Aldo Monti, actor (died 2016)
 February 24 – Modesta Lavana, healer and activist for indigenous rights in Hueyapan (died 2010)
March 24 – Ángela Gurría, sculptor (died 2023)
April 5 – Vicente García Bernal, Bishop of Roman Catholic Diocese of Ciudad Obregón (1988–2005). (died 2017)
 April 28 – Evangelina Elizondo, actress (died 2017)
July 28 – José Solé, stage actor and director (Premio Nacional de Ciencias y Artes) (d. 2017)
 August 20 – Carlos Ancira, film actor (died 1987)
October 17 — Sergio Chávez Saldaña, Chihuahua surgeon and teacher (d. 2018).
November 18 — Francisco Savín, composer and director of Xalapa Symphony Orchestra (1963-1967); (d. 2018).
Date unknown — Adela Peralta Leppe, actress, first female clown in Mexico (d. 2018)

Deaths
10 January – Julio Antonio Mella, activist 
March 20 – Miguel Alemán González, general (born 1884)

Date unknown
Benigno Montoya Muñoz,  architect, sculptor and painter (b. 1865)

References

 
1920s in Mexico
Years of the 20th century in Mexico
Mexico